1993 in philosophy

Events 
 Willard Van Orman Quine was awarded the Rolf Schock Prize in Logic and Philosophy "for his systematical and penetrating discussions of how learning of language and communication are based on socially available evidence and of the consequences of this for theories on knowledge and linguistic meaning - in particular the works From a Logical Point of View (1953), Word and Object (1960), and Pursuit of Truth (1990, 1992)".

Publications 
 Hans-Georg Gadamer, The Enigma of Health: The Art of Healing in a Scientific Age, 1993
 Norbert Wiener, Invention: The Care and Feeding of Ideas, 1993 (posthumously)
 Judith Butler, Bodies That Matter, 1993
 Jean-Luc Nancy, The Sense of the World, 1993 (originally published in French as Le sens du monde)
 Vernor Vinge, The Coming Technological Singularity, 1993
 Howard Rheingold, The Virtual Community, 1993

Deaths 
 February 5 - Hans Jonas (born 1903)
 November 19 - Kenneth Burke (born 1897)

References 

Philosophy
20th-century philosophy
Philosophy by year